William Alex Pridemore (born October 14, 1969) is an American criminologist who is a professor in, and the dean of, the University at Albany, SUNY's School of Criminal Justice. He is also an affiliate faculty member at the Rollins School of Public Health at Emory University.

Education
Pridemore received his B.A. and M.A. from Indiana University in criminal justice, after which he received his Ph.D. from the University at Albany in 2000.

Career
Before joining the faculty of the University at Albany as dean and professor in 2015, he was a distinguished professor at Georgia State University in their Department of Criminal Justice and Criminology for two years. Before that, he was a professor in the Department of Criminal Justice at Indiana University from 2009 to 2013.

Research
Pridemore is known for researching the relationship between social structure, alcohol, and violence. This research has reported a positive relationship between alcohol outlets and rates of assault, which he has also reported can be reduced by higher degrees of social cohesion in neighborhoods. He has also studied anti-abortion violence and the relationship between incarceration and mortality.

References

External links
Faculty page

1969 births
Living people
American criminologists
University at Albany, SUNY alumni
University at Albany, SUNY faculty
Indiana University alumni
Georgia State University faculty
Indiana University faculty